The 2002 Bathurst 24 Hour was an endurance motor race staged at the Mount Panorama Circuit just outside Bathurst in New South Wales, Australia. The race, which was the first 24-hour event to be held at Mount Panorama, started at 4:00pm on 16 November and finished at 4:00pm on 17 November. It was the first 24 Hour race to be held in Australia since the 1954 Mount Druitt 24 Hours Road Race.

The race was open to several classes of GT and other production based cars and was intended as a showcase for the racing categories promoted by PROCAR, which included Nations Cup, GT Performance and GT Production. While there was much speculation about the highly popular V8 Brute Utes class also being eligible there was resistance to the idea and they ran short sprint races as a support category. Ten classes were announced, but only five classes attracted entries.

Group 1
The leading class contained vehicles from the international FIA N-GT category and Group 1 cars from the Australian Nations' Cup category. It featured the Ferrari 360 N-GT, Mosler MT900R, Porsche 996 GT3-RS, Porsche 996 GT3 Cup and the controversial Holden Monaro 427C which did not have a production counterpart.

Group 3
A class open to Group 3 cars from the Australian Nations' Cup category and to Supertouring cars. Only three BMWs entered, Supertouring versions of the 318i and 320i and a modified Z3 M Coupe.

Group 5
A production based class featuring GT Performance Cars. The entry consisted of BMW ME Coupe, Ford Tickford T3 TE50, HSV Y Series GTS, Mazda RX-7 Series 8, Mitsubishi Lancer Evolution, Nissan 200SX, Nissan 350Z and Subaru Impreza WRX STi.

Group 9
A production based class featuring cars from the Australian GT Production Car Championship. The entry consisted of BMW 323i, Holden VX Commodore, Honda S2000 and Toyota MR2 Bathurst.

Group 10
A mixed bag of leftovers, it included Future Touring Cars; Holden Commodores and a Holden V8 engined Mitsubishi Magna, a pair of Nürburgring VLN series BMW M3s and a late concession for Mitsubishi Mirage Cup one-make series cars.

Top 10 Qualifiers
The top 10 qualifiers for the 2002 Bathurst 24 Hour were as follows:

<small>* During the first qualifying session, the #999 PHR Scuderia Porsche 996 GT3-RS driven by Jim Richards set a time of 2:20.4364 which would have placed the car 4th on the grid. However, later during that same qualifying session, Peter Fitzgerald crashed on the top of the mountain which damaged the car beyond immediate repair. PHR were then forced to substitute team owner Maher Algadrie's Porsche 996 GT3 Cup car in the race. Due to having to substitute cars, the original lap time did not count and the GT3 Cup car eventually qualified in 14th place.

Official results
Results as follows

* #999 PHR Scuderia Porsche 996 GT3-RS had set 4th fastest qualifying time. However, due to a practice crash the car was withdrawn and replaced by the teams 996 GT3 Cup car. As the RS was withdrawn the original time was not counted for grid position.

References

Statistics
 Pole Position - #888 Brad Jones - 2:15.0742
 Fastest Lap - #427 Garth Tander - 2:14.3267 (lap 359)
 Average Speed - 138 km/h

External links
2002 Bathurst 24 Hour race statistics Retrieved from web.archive.org on 1 December 2008
2002 Bathurst 24 Hour images Retrieved from www.pbase.com on 1 December 2008

Motorsport in Bathurst, New South Wales
Bathurst 24 Hour
Procar Australia
November 2002 sports events in Australia